Eurytides asius is a species of butterfly in the family Papilionidae. It is found in the Neotropical realm in southeastern Brazil (Bahia, Minas Gerais, Espirito Santo, Rio de Janeiro, São Paulo, Paraná, Santa Catarina, Rio Grande do Sul), and Paraguay.

Etymology
The specific name is named in the classical tradition for Asius son of Hyrtacus who was the leader of the Trojan allies, the Equites Trojani of Carl Linnaeus.

Description
Upperside: Antennae, thorax, and abdomen black. Wings raven black, having a pale yellow bar rising at the anterior edges near the tips of the superior wings, and crossing these and the inferior ones, meeting even with the abdomen, becoming wider gradually. Posterior wings furnished with two tails, and along the external edges having four small yellow crescents, and another at the abdominal corners; above which are two long square red spots, and another yellow crescent on the abdominal edges.
Underside: Palpi, legs, and breast black. Abdomen black, with a white longitudinal stripe on each side. Wings marked nearly as on the upperside; the posterior having several red spots and streaks more than on the upper side, and placed next the body from the shoulders to the abdominal corners. Wingspan 3 inches (76 mm).

Biology

The larva feeds on Annona cacans.

References

Lewis, H. L., 1974 Butterflies of the World  Page 23, figure 11.

Further reading
Edwin Möhn, 2002 Schmetterlinge der Erde, Butterflies of the world Part XIIII (14), Papilionidae VIII: Baronia, Euryades, Protographium, Neographium, Eurytides. Edited by Erich Bauer and Thomas Frankenbach Keltern: Goecke & Evers; Canterbury: Hillside Books.  All species and subspecies are included, also most of the forms. Several females are shown the first time in colour.

External links

Butterflies of America

Eurytides
Butterflies described in 1781